The 2011 IIHF World Championship Division II were international Ice Hockey tournaments run by the International Ice Hockey Federation. Group A was contested from 4–10 April 2011 in Melbourne, Australia and Group B was contested from 10 to 16 April 2011 in Zagreb, Croatia. Prior to the start of the tournament the North Korean national team announced they would withdraw, citing financial reasons. All games against them were counted as a forfeit, with a score of 5–0 for the opposing team. This was the last year of parallel divisional tournaments so teams that finished third and above formed Group A for 2012, and the lower finishers formed Group B.

Participants

Group A

Group B

Group A Tournament

Standings

Fixtures

All times local.

Scoring leaders
List shows the top ten skaters sorted by points, then goals.

GP = Games played; G = Goals; A = Assists; Pts = Points; +/− = Plus/minus; PIM = Penalties in minutes; POS = PositionSource: IIHF.com

Leading goaltenders
Only the top five goaltenders, based on save percentage, who have played 40% of their team's minutes are included in this list.
TOI = Time on ice (minutes:seconds); SA = Shots against; GA = Goals against; GAA = Goals against average; Sv% = Save percentage; SO = ShutoutsSource: IIHF.com

Tournament Awards
 Best players selected by the directorate  
Best Goaltender: 
Best Forward: 
Best Defenceman: 

 Best players
Best player of each team selected by the coaches.

Group B Tournament

Standings

Fixtures 
All times local.

Scoring leaders
List shows the top ten skaters sorted by points, then goals.

GP = Games played; G = Goals; A = Assists; Pts = Points; +/− = Plus/minus; PIM = Penalties in minutes; POS = PositionSource: IIHF.com

Leading goaltenders
Only the top five goaltenders, based on save percentage, who have played 40% of their team's minutes are included in this list.
TOI = Time on ice (minutes:seconds); SA = Shots against; GA = Goals against; GAA = Goals against average; Sv% = Save percentage; SO = ShutoutsSource: IIHF.com

Tournament Awards
 Best players selected by the directorate  
Best Goaltender: 
Best Forward: 
Best Defenceman: 

 Best players
Best player of each team selected by the coaches.

References

External links
Ice Hockey Australia host page
Passionhockey.com archive page with commentary

IIHF World Championship Division II
3
IIHF World Championship Division II
IIHF World Championship Division II
International ice hockey competitions hosted by Australia
International ice hockey competitions hosted by Croatia